Charles "Charley" Horton is a former American football halfback who played one season with the Montreal Alouettes of the Canadian Football League (CFL). He was drafted by the Los Angeles Rams of the National Football League (NFL) with the eleventh overall pick of the 1956 NFL Draft. He played college football at Vanderbilt University and attended St. Petersburg High School in St. Petersburg, Florida.

Early years
Horton played high school football for the St. Petersburg High School Green Devils. He was named Honorable mention All-State and played in the Florida All-Star high school football game. He also participated in track and field and was a Florida high hurdle state champion. He was inducted into the St. Petersburg High School Athletic Hall of fame in 1999.

College career
Horton played for the Vanderbilt Commodores football team from 1952 to 1955. Horton was named a third team All-American by the International News Service in 1955. He was named first team All-SEC his senior year and second team All-SEC his junior year. He was the MVP of the 1955 Gator Bowl, rushing for 57 yards on 13 carries and one touchdown in Vanderbilt's 25–13 win over the Auburn Tigers. Horton scored a then-Vanderbilt record of twelve touchdowns in 1955. He played in the Chicago College All-Star Game. He also participated in track and field for the Commodores.

Professional career
Horton was drafted by the Los Angeles Rams of the NFL in the first round of the 1956 NFL Draft. He was instead required to serve two years in the United States Navy after joining the NROTC at Vanderbilt. While in the Navy he played football at Naval Amphibious Base Little Creek, being named the Most Valuable All-Service player in 1957. He was also named first team All-Sea Service in 1956 and 1957.

Horton appeared in five games for the Montreal Alouettes of the CFL in 1958.

Officiating career
Horton officiated college football games after his playing days. He was an official in 17 bowl games, including the 1986 Orange Bowl, 1987 Fiesta Bowl and 1992 Rose Bowl.

References

External links
Just Sports Stats

Living people
Players of American football from St. Petersburg, Florida
American football halfbacks
Canadian football running backs
American players of Canadian football
Vanderbilt Commodores football players
Montreal Alouettes players
Players of Canadian football from St. Petersburg, Florida
St. Petersburg High School alumni
1935 births